Jang Phyong-il (born 10 October 1984) is a North Korean former footballer. He represented North Korea on at least three occasions in 2003.

Career statistics

International

References

1984 births
Living people
North Korean footballers
North Korea international footballers
Association football midfielders